FIFA Mobile is an association football simulation video game developed by EA Mobile and EA Canada and published by EA Sports for iOS and Android. It was released on 11 October 2016 as a replacement to the FIFA Ultimate Team mobile games, for iOS and Android. Microsoft Windows was also included until 2017. It was announced on August 16, 2016, during Gamescom 2016.

Gameplay
The game introduces a new "VS Attack" mode in which players mostly play the offensive stages of a match. They also had to defend counter-attacks from the opposition (until before the 6th season). The VS Attack mode features an asynchronous turn-based multiplayer. The game also features Live Events themed on recent real world events, as well as mini games based on skills such as shooting, passing, dribbling and goalkeeping. It also includes events based on the Champions League and other different leagues throughout the world.

Development and release
EA announced the game on August 16, 2016, during Gamescom 2016 and the game was released worldwide on October 11, 2016, for iOS, Android, and Microsoft Windows. In November 2017, EA ended support for FIFA Mobile on Windows devices.

FIFA Mobile 17
On June 23, 2016, EA Sports announced that the J1 League and J.League Cup would be featured in the game for the first time. On September 4, 2016, EA Sports announced at Brasil Game Show 2016 that 18 Campeonato Brasileiro Série A teams will be featured in their respective league (Corinthians and Flamengo, who signed an exclusivity deal with Konami for Pro Evolution Soccer, do not appear). Five Série B teams are also in the game. The Brazilian teams in the game have generic player names which the user cannot change.

FIFA Mobile 18
It features the third tier of Germany's Bundesliga, the 3. Liga, and has again included the Turkish Süper Lig after EA renewed its licence with them.

FIFA Mobile 19
FIFA Mobile 19 introduces the UEFA Champions League. It was confirmed that the game would have a licensed Serie A. The game will include the CSL, the first FIFA title to do so.  However, it was confirmed that the game will not include the Russian Premier League, as it did in FIFA Mobile 18 and previous FIFA Mobile versions. The Russian Premier League teams PFC CSKA Moscow, Spartak Moscow, and Lokomotiv Moscow were kept, while Dinamo Zagreb, Dynamo Kyiv, Slavia Praha, and Viktoria Plzen were added to the game. Boca Juniors appears as Buenos Aires FC in the game since the club signed a deal with Konami; for the same reasons, Colo-Colo appears as CD Viñazur. Once again, due to Konami securing deals with certain Brazilian clubs, the Campeonato Brasileiro Série A is featured in an incomplete form, this time with only 15 clubs, with the notable omissions of São Paulo, Palmeiras, Corinthians, Flamengo and Vasco da Gama, all of which are Konami partners. The remaining Brazilian clubs, while appearing with licensed branding, do not have any of their players licensed due to an ongoing judicial dispute over image rights, which are negotiated individually with each player, unlike other countries.

FIFA Mobile 20
The game features more than 30 official leagues, over 700 clubs and over 17,000 players. Included for the first time is the Romanian Liga 1 and its 14 teams and also the Indian Super League (ISL) with its all 11 clubs, as well as UAE club, Al Ain, who were added following extensive requests from the fans in the region.

FIFA Mobile 21

FIFA Mobile 21 was released on 2 November 2020. This season of FIFA Mobile saw the addition of the League Matchups mode.

FIFA Mobile 22
EA Sports announced the arrival of FIFA Mobile 22 for Android and iOS devices. This season of FIFA Mobile made more changes in terms of graphics and gameplay. A new market system was introduced. The 2022 update also saw the removal of 'Stamina'. Clubs such as Ferencvárosi TC, Hajduk Split, Wrexham FC, and APOEL FC were added to the game. EA released its FIFA Mobile 22 on 18 January 2022.

References

2016 video games
Association football video games
EA Sports games
Electronic Arts games
FIFA (video game series)
Android (operating system) games
IOS games
Multiplayer and single-player video games